Arnhem Metal Meeting was a heavy metal festival held in Arnhem, Netherlands in 2004 to 2007. It was booked by TMR Music Promotions and took place at the Musis Sacrum in Arnhem.

The 2008 edition did not take place due to the organization costs. No further plans were made to hold the event in Arnhem. However, there was a 2009 follow-up edition in Eindhoven called Eindhoven Metal Meeting, which continued as a 2-day event from 2010 to recent time.

Lineups

2004
Held on 4 December 2004.

 Samael
 Entombed
 Suffocation
 Unleashed
 Primordial
 Impaled Nazarene
 1349
 Gorerotted
 God Dethroned
 Desaster
 Inhume
 Heidevolk

2005
Held on 26 November 2005.

 Destruction
 Candlemass
 Enslaved
 Dismember
 Ensiferum
 Grave
 Mercenary
 Thyrfing
 Totenmond
 Callenish Circle
 Leng Tch'e
 Officium Triste
 Volbeat
 Fluisterwoud

2006
Held on 9 December 2006.

 Arch Enemy
 Immolation
 Anathema
 Antaeus
 Necrophobic
 Tankard
 Melechesh
 Ancient Rites
 General Surgery
 Aeternus
 Moonsorrow
 Skyforger
 Pungent Stench
 Thronar
 Flesh Made Sin

2007
Held on 1 December 2007.
Sodom
Asphyx
God Dethroned
Hollenthon
Marduk
Unleashed
Primordial
Holy Moses
Nifelheim
Cruachan
Haemorrhage
Vreid
Cypher
Severe Torture
Panchrysia
Obsidian

References

External links
 Official website (no longer active as of October 2, 2008)
 Arnhem Metal Meeting 2005

Music festivals in the Netherlands
Heavy metal festivals in the Netherlands
Events in Arnhem
Music festivals established in 2004
Recurring events disestablished in 2007
2004 establishments in the Netherlands
2007 disestablishments in the Netherlands